The Sultanate of Damagaram was a Muslim pre-colonial state in what is now southeastern Niger, centered on the city of Zinder.

History

Rise 
The Sultanate of Damagaram was founded in 1731 (near Mirriah, modern Niger) by Muslim Kanouri aristocrats, led by Mallam (r. 1736–1743). Damagaram was at the beginning a vassal state of the decaying Kanem-Bornu Empire, but it quickly came to conquer all its fellow vassal states of western Bornu. In the 1830s, the small band of Bornu nobles and retainers conquered the Myrria kingdom, the Sassebaki sultanates (including Zinder). By the 19th century, Damagaram had absorbed 18 Bornu vassal states in the area.

Zinder rose from a small Hausa village to an important center of the Trans-Saharan trade with the moving of the capital of Damagaram there in 1736. The large fortress of the southeast central city (Birini) was built shortly thereafter, and became a major hub for trade south through Kano and east to Bornu. The Hausa town and Zengou, its Tuareg suburb, expanded with this trade.

Apex
Damagaram had a mixed relationship with the other major regional power, the Sokoto Caliphate to the south. While it provided aid to the animist Hausa-led refugee states to its west (in what is now Niger) who were formed from the rump of the states conquered by the Sokoto Caliph, Damagaram also maintained good relations with its southern neighbors. Damagaram sat astride the major trade route linking Tripoli to Kano, one of the more powerful Sokoto sultanates, which provided the economic lifeblood of both states. An east–west trade from the Niger River to Bornu also passed through Zinder, making relations with animist neighbors like Maradi or the Gobirwa as profitable, and thus important. Damagaram also covered some of the more productive of Bornu's western salt-producing evaporation mines, as well as farms producing Ostrich feathers, highly valued in Europe.

In the mid-19th century, European travelers estimated the state covered some 70,000 square kilometers and had a population of over 400,000, mostly Hausa, but also Tuareg, Fula, Kanuri, Arab and Toubou. At the center of the state was the royal family, a Sultan (in Hausa the Sarkin Damagaram) with many wives (estimated at 300 by visitor Heinrich Barth in 1851) and children, and a tradition of direct (to son or brother) succession which reached 26 rulers by 1906. The sultan ruled through the activities of two primary officers: the Ciroma (Military commander and prime minister) and his heir apparent, the Yakudima. By the end of the 19th century, Damagaram could field an army of 5,000 cavalry, 30,000-foot soldiers. Damagaram could also call upon forces of the allied Kel Gres Tuareg who formed communities near Zinder and other parts of the sultanate. Gun carriages and cannons were produced in the state by the second half of the 19th century. According to Robin Law, such artillery were ineffective for war or rarely used practically.

French conquest
When the French arrived in force in the 1890s, Zinder was the only city of over 10,000 in what is today Niger. Damagaram found itself threatened by well-armed European incursions to the west, and the conquering forces of Rabih az-Zubayr to the east and south. In 1898, A French force under Captain Marius Gabriel Cazemajou spent three weeks under the Sultan's protection in Damagaram. Cazemajou had been dispatched to form an alliance against the British with Rabih, and the Sultan's court was alarmed at the prospect of their two most powerful new threats linking up. Cazemajou was murdered by a faction at the court, and the remainder of the French escaped, protected by other factions. In 1899, the reconstituted elements of the ill-fated Voulet-Chanoine Mission finally arrived in Damagaram on their way to revenge Cazemajou's death. Meeting on 30 July at the Battle of Tirmini, 10 km from Zinder, the well-armed Senegalese-French troops defeated the Sultan and took Damagaram's capital.

With colonialism came the loss of some of Damagaram's traditional lands and its most important trade partner to the British in Nigeria.

The French placed the capital of the new Niger Military Territory there in 1911. In 1926, following fears of Hausa revolts and improving relations with the Djerma of the west, the capital was transferred to the village of Niamey.

The brother of Sultan Ahmadou mai Roumji had earlier sided with the French, and was placed on the throne in 1899 as Sultan Ahamadou dan Bassa. Following French intelligence that a rising by Hausa in the area was preparing a revolt with the aid of the Sultan, a puppet Sultan was placed in power in 1906, though the royal line was restored in 1923. The Sultanate continues to operate in a ceremonial function into the 21st century.

Economy
The wealth of Damagaram depended on three related sources: taxes and income from the caravan trade, the capture and the exchange of slaves, and internal taxes.

Environmental policies
Damagaram was originally an area of hunting and gathering activities. As the sultanate developed, the rulers encouraged the rural population to expand farming. Most of the land, especially that surrounding the capital Zinder, belonged to the Sultan and a few notables. In all cases, people who held land were obliged to pay an annual tribute to the sultan.

In order to limit the environmental degradation of this conversion to agriculture, the sultan Tanimoune (1854–84) enforced laws to forbid the cutting of certain trees, with particular emphasis on the gawo tree (Faidherbia albida) with its fertilising properties: "He who cuts a gawo tree without authorization will have his head severed; he who mutilates it without reason will have an arm cut off." The sultan and later his successors also proceeded to plant trees, gawo trees in particular, and dispersed the seeds throughout the empire. The fallow period for land at that time was six years.

The authority that the sultan claimed on trees was a new practice, breaking with customary views on trees in the Sahel. Traditionally, trees were considered 'gifts from the gods' and could not be owned by any individual, but belonged either to the spirits of the bush or to God. The policies of sultan Tanimoune anchored a new perception: they became called the 'trees of the sultan'.

Sultans of Damagaram
The Sultanate of Damagaram has been ruled by the following sultans:
Mallam Yunus dan Ibram 1731–1746
Baba dan Mallam 1746–1757
Tanimoun Babami 1757–1775
Assafa dan Tanimoun 1775–1782
Abaza dan Tanimoun 1782–1787
Mallam dan Tanimoun Babou Tsaba 1787–1790
Daouda dan Tanimoun 1790–1799
Ahmadou dan Tanimoun Na Chanza 1799–1812
Sulayman dan Tanimoun 1812–1822
Ibrahim dan Suleyman 1822-1841
Tanimoun dan Suleyman 1841-1843
Ibrahim dan Suleyman (restored) 1843–1851
Tanimoun dan Suleyman (restored) 1851-1884
Abba Gato 1884
Suleyman dan Aisa 1884-1893
Amadou dan Tanimoun Mai Roumji Kouran Daga 1893-1899
Amadou dan Tanimoun dan Bassa 1899-1906
Ballama (regent) 1906-1923
Barma Moustapha 1923-1950
Sanda Oumarou dan Amadou 1950-1978
Aboubacar Sanda Oumarou 1978-2000
Mamadou Moustafa 2000-2011
Aboubacar Sanda Oumarou (restored) 2011–present

See also
List of Sunni Muslim dynasties

Notes

References 
 Columbia Encyclopedia:Zinder
 
 James Decalo. Historical Dictionary of Niger. Scarecrow Press/ Metuchen. NJ - London (1979) 
 Finn Fuglestad. A History of Niger: 1850–1960. Cambridge University Press (1983) 

Countries in precolonial Africa
History of Niger
Zinder
Zinder Region
States and territories established in 1731
Former sultanates